The Journal of Business Cycle Research is a triannual peer-reviewed academic journal in the field of economics with a focus on business cycles. It is published by Springer Science+Business Media on behalf of the Centre for International Research on Economic Tendency Surveys. Until 2015 it was published jointly by the Centre and the Organisation for Economic Co-operation and Development. The journal was established in 2004 as the Journal of Business Cycle Measurement and Analysis, obtaining its current title in 2016. The editor-in-chief is Marcelle Chauvet (University of California Riverside); previous editors were Günter Poser (2004–2005), Bernd Schips (2006–2007), and Michael Graff (2008-2020).
The 2021 impact factor of JBCY is 3.625

Abstracting and indexing 
The journal is abstracted and indexed in EconLit and Research Papers in Economics.

References

External links
 
 Journal page at Springer Science+Business Media

Biannual journals
Business cycle
Economics journals
English-language journals
OECD
Publications established in 2004
Springer Science+Business Media academic journals